Late period may refer to:

 a sign of pregnancy
 Oligomenorrhea, a type of menstrual disorder
 Late Period of ancient Egypt, 664 BC until 332 BC